Real Hair is the second EP by American indie rock band Speedy Ortiz, released on February 11, 2014 by Carpark Records. The EP draws "inspiration from contemporary Top 40 and R&B radio in addition to their regular arsenal of guitar rock".

The artwork for the album features a childhood photo of fellow Massachusetts band Pile's bassist Matt Connery.

Ahead of its official release, the album premiered on Pitchfork Media's Advance streaming service.

Personnel
Sadie Dupuis - Guitar, Voice
Matt Robidoux - Guitar
Darl Ferm - Bass Guitar
Mike Falcone - Drums, Voice
Paul Q. Kolderie - Recorder, Mixer

Track listing 
All songs by Speedy Ortiz.

References

2014 EPs
Carpark Records albums
Speedy Ortiz albums